Sri Lanka competed at the 1988 Summer Olympics in Seoul, South Korea.

Competitors
The following is the list of number of competitors in the Games.

Athletics

 Tilaka Jinadasa
 Vithanakande Samarasinghe
Men's Marathon — 2:31.29 (→ 65th place)

Shooting

 Daya Rajasinghe Nadarajasingham

Swimming

 Julian Boiling
Men's 400m Freestyle
 Heat – 4:18.88 (→ did not advance, 46th place)

Men's 400m Individual Medley
 Heat – 4:53.61 (→ did not advance, 32nd place)

 Dipika Chanmugam
Women's 100m Breaststroke
 Heat – 1:20.18 (→ did not advance, 38th place)

Women's 200m Breaststroke
 Heat – 2:51.60 (→ did not advance, 42nd place)

Women's 200m Individual Medley
 Heat – 2:33.58 (→ did not advance, 31st place)

References
	
Official Olympic Reports	
Sri Lanka at the 1988 Seoul Summer Games

Nations at the 1988 Summer Olympics
1988
1988 in Sri Lankan sport